Diwang International Fortune Center is a supertall skyscraper in Liuzhou, Guangxi, China. Construction started in 2010 and was completed in 2015.

See also
List of tallest buildings in China

References

Buildings and structures in Liuzhou
Buildings and structures under construction in China
Skyscrapers in Guangxi
Skyscraper office buildings in China
Skyscraper hotels in China